Marco Ban (born 26 August 1994) is a German footballer who plays as a forward for SpVg Frechen 20.

Career
Ban made his professional debut for Fortuna Köln in the 3. Liga on 16 May 2015, coming on as a substitute in the 58th minute for Thomas Kraus in the 2–1 home win against Wehen Wiesbaden.

References

External links
 Profile at DFB.de
 Profile at kicker.de
 Profile at sport.de

1994 births
Living people
German footballers
Croatian footballers
German people of Croatian descent
Association football forwards
1. FC Köln II players
SC Fortuna Köln players
Bonner SC players
3. Liga players
Regionalliga players